Robert Hartmann may refer to:

 Robert Hartmann (naturalist) (1832–1893), German naturalist, anatomist, and ethnographer
 Robert Hartmann (referee) (born 1979), German referee
 Robert T. Hartmann (1917–2008), American political advisor, speechwriter and reporter

See also
 Hartmann
 Robert S. Hartman (1910–1973), German-American logician and philosopher